Murias may refer to:

People
 Halina Murias (born 1955), Polish politician
 Manolo Sánchez Murias (born 1976), Spanish retired footballer and a current manager

Places
 Murias (Aller), a village in the municipality of Aller, Asturias, Spain
 Murias (Candamo), a village in the municipality of Candamo, Asturias, Spain
 Murias de Paredes, a municipality located in the province of León, Castile and León, Spain

Other uses
 Euskadi–Murias, a Spanish UCI Professional Continental cycling team
 Murias, a city of the Mythological Cycle of early Irish literature; see Four Treasures of the Tuatha Dé Danann

See also
 Muria (disambiguation)